Qvigstad is a surname. Notable people with the surname include:

Just Knud Qvigstad (1853–1957), Norwegian philologist, linguist, ethnographer, historian, and cultural historian
Just Knut Qvigstad (1902–2001), Norwegian engineer
Lasse Qvigstad (born 1946), Norwegian jurist

Norwegian-language surnames